Gustav Christofer Ingemar Fjellner (born 13 December 1976) is a Swedish politician who served as a Member of the European Parliament (MEP) from 2004 until 2019. He is a member of the Moderate Party, part of the European People's Party. Fjellner gained national prominence as chairman of the Moderate Youth League from 2002 to 2004.

Fjellner served on the European Parliament's Committee on International Trade and its Committee on Budgetary Control. In that capacity, he drafted the Parliament's review of EU spending in 2010. He was also a substitute for the Committee on the Environment, Public Health and Food Safety, a member of the delegation for relations with Belarus, and a substitute for the delegation for relations with Iran.

In September 2016, Fjellner joined more than 50 MEPs from six different political groups – including Ashley Fox, Alojz Peterle, Vicky Ford and Beatrix von Storch – in signing a proposal for a two-term limit of the President of the European Parliament. This move was widely seen as an effort to prevent incumbent Martin Schulz from holding onto the presidency for a third consecutive term.

Career
 Studied political science and public finance, Uppsala University and Lund University
 Researcher, Timbro (free-market think tank), 1997
 Information officer, Svenska arbetsgivare föreningen (Swedish employers association), 1998–2000
 Editorial writer, Svenska Dagbladet, 1999
 Consultant, sagt:gjort (public relations firm), 2001
 Vice-President and co-founder of Look Closer AB (business intelligence company)
 Chairman, Moderate Youth League, 2002–2004
 President, Nordisk Ungkonservativ Union (Nordic Young Conservatives), 2002–2004
 Member of executive board, Moderaterna Swedish Conservatives)
 Member of Enköping Municipal Council, 1998-2002
 Member of Uppsala County Council, 1998-2002

References

External links
 

1976 births
Living people
People from Västerås
Moderate Party politicians
Moderate Party MEPs
MEPs for Sweden 2004–2009
MEPs for Sweden 2009–2014
MEPs for Sweden 2014–2019